Halik (International title: Betrayal / ) is a 2018 Philippine drama television series starring Jericho Rosales, Sam Milby, Yen Santos and Yam Concepcion. The series premiered on ABS-CBN's Primetime Bida evening block and worldwide via The Filipino Channel from August 13, 2018 to April 26, 2019, replacing Since I Found You.

Series overview

Episodes

Season 1 (2018–19)

Season 2 (2019)

References

Lists of Philippine drama television series episodes